Vostok and Voskhod were two spacecraft flown by the Soviet Union. Between 1960 and 1966, Vostok and Voskhod performed 11 successful, 2 partially successful and 3 unsuccessful missions. There are allegations that the Soviets had sent more Vostok missions than what Russian officials said, which are excluded from this list.

Vostok missions

Voskhod missions

See also 
 Soviet space program
 Voskhod programme
 Vostok programme

Vostok and Voshkad
Vostok program
Voskhod program